The Woody Allen Show is a British stand-up comedy television show featuring American comedian Woody Allen first screened in the UK on 10 February 1965. The special was made by Granada Television. It is thought to be the only complete special featuring Woody Allen that exists.

Content and production 
Allen was in the United Kingdom filming Casino Royale which was released in 1967. During this time, Allen recorded a half-hour show for the ITV contractor Granada Television. According to Leo Benedictus from The Guardian, the special might be the only complete standup special from Allen that exists. Allen's routine includes parts of Allen's comedy albums, including "The Moose".

Reception 
The special was rediscovered in 2013 to which several critics commented on the show. Ben Brock of IndieWire was impressed by Allen's performing style describing the "level of energy evident in the way he leaps around the microphone". Leo Benedictus, writing for The Guardian, was complimentary: "Allen's style, though mannered, is always relaxed and conversational, which is why it hasn't dated. Most of the laughs in his stories come from their absurd situations or his skillful wordplay, yet he tells them like a modern comedian complaining about lifts."

References

External links 

 
 
 
 
  (Fresh Air), 15 June 2009
 
 
 
 

1965 in British television
1965 British television episodes
1965 television specials
Black-and-white British television shows
English-language television shows
ITV comedy
Television shows produced by Granada Television